Laudya Cynthia Bella (born 24 February 1988, in Bandung, West Java, Indonesia) is an Indonesian singer and actress. She is mix of Sundanese, Javanese and Minangkabau descent.

Personal life
Bella married second time with Malaysian media strategist, Engku Emran Engku Zainal Abidin in Kuala Lumpur, Malaysia, on 8 September 2017. Engku Emran was previously married to Malaysian actress Erra Fazira from 2007 to 2014. They divorced in June 2020.

Career
Bella worked as a model before moving to acting career. She was selected as a Kawanku magazine finalist in 2002. She played the character Biyan in the film Virgin (2004), for which she was nominated for Best Leading Actress at the 2005 Indonesian Film Festival and won "Best Female Leading Role" award at the 2005 Festival Film Bandung.

Bella joined to Melly Goeslaw's vocal group, BBB (stands for Bukan Bintang Biasa), together with Raffi Ahmad, Chelsea Olivia Wijaya, Dimas Beck, and Ayushita in 2006. In addition, BBB appears in the drama-themed film was directed by Lasja Fauzia, titled Bukan Bintang Biasa. Still same of year, Bella had appeared a cameo role in the film Berbagi Suami and played as Risa Apriliyanti in a horror-themed movie, Lentera Merah.

She also starring in the soap opera Jurangan Jengkol, for which she earned a trophy for "Famous Actress" category at the 2006 SCTV Awards. In addition, she has appeared in several soap opera television and advertisement. In 2011, Bella has played for film which had coincide in Lebaran, titled Di Bawah Lindungan Ka'bah, for which she won "Best Leading Actress" award at the 2012 e-Guardians Awards and was nominated for "Best Female Leading Role" at the 2012 Festival Film Bandung.

In 2013, Bella starred a thriller-horror movie, Belenggu, for which she won the "Favorite Actress" award at the 2013 Indonesian Movie Awards. She was nominated for Best Leading Actress at the 2013 Indonesian Film Festival and nominated for "Best Actress" at the 2013 Indonesian Movie Awards.

In 2014, Bella starred in the drama Haji Backpacker. This movie follows the main character as she travels to Mecca for the Hajj. It was shot in nine countries: Indonesia, Thailand, Vietnam, China, India, Tibet, Nepal, Iran, and Saudi Arabia. She received a nomination for "Most Riveting Role" at the 2014 Maya Awards.

Discography

Soundtrack album
 Ost. Bukan Bintang Biasa (2007)

Singles

Video clip

Filmography

Film

Television

Film Television

Musical Drama

TV Commercial

Awards and nominations

References

External links
 
 
 
 

1988 births
Living people
People from Bandung
Minangkabau people
Javanese people
Sundanese people
Indonesian actresses
21st-century Indonesian women singers
Indonesian television personalities